Pappan priyapatta Pappan is a 1986 Indian Malayalam-Fantasy film directed by Sathyan Anthikad and written by Siddique–Lal. It stars Mohanlal, Rahman, Thilakan, Lissy, Bahadoor, Unni Mary, Rajan P. Dev and Sankaradi. This is the debut film of Siddique-Lal duo and Harisree Ashokan. The storyline is similar to Heaven Can Wait.

Plot
A singer Pappan is killed in a bike accident, by rival singer Umesh; but Yamaraj the Lord of Death realizes that Pappan had a few more days to live. Yamarajan  allows Pappan to enter into bodies of other dead people. He first enters the body of a rich old man, then onto a Robinhood  thief's body and finally onto CI (police)Devdas' body in a bid to tell his girlfriend Sarina that Pappan is dead, and to look forward to someone else in life.

Cast
 Mohanlal as C.I. Devdas (The body which carries the soul of Pappan)
 Rahman as Padmakumar aka Pappan
 Thilakan as Yamarajan
 Jose as Umesh
 Lissy as Sarina
 Bahadur as Valyamangalathu Padmanabhan
 Nedumudi Venu as  Kayikkara Kochappu
 Unnimary as Shantha
 Alummoodan as Chitragupthan
 Rajan P. Dev as Puli Sankaran
 Innocent as Constable Kuttan
 Sankaradi as Singapore Antappan
 Jose Prakash as Chandra Menon 
 N. F. Varghese as Prabhakaran
 Kunchan as Kunjan Pillai M.L.A
 Harisree Ashokan
 Priya as Item Dancer
 Mala Aravindan 
 Meena as Ammini
 Zainuddin

Soundtrack
The music was composed by Alleppey Ranganath and lyrics were written by R. K. Damodaran and Sathyan Anthikad.

Release
Distributed by Dinny Films, Pappan Priyappetta Pappan was released on 3 January 1986. Upon release, the film was a commercial failure. However, it has over the years attained a cult following. Siddique in an interview with The Times of India told, "At that time Malayalis were not ready to accept death as a suitable subject for humour. It was a movie made a bit ahead of its time,”

References

External links
 

1986 films
1980s Malayalam-language films
Films directed by Sathyan Anthikad
Films about reincarnation
1986 fantasy films
Indian fantasy films
Films about the afterlife